Ezekiel Elijah Elliott (born July 22, 1995), nicknamed "Zeke ", is an American football running back who is a free agent. He played college football at Ohio State, where he earned second-team All-America honors in 2015. Elliott was drafted by the Cowboys fourth overall in the 2016 NFL Draft. As a three-time Pro Bowl and two-time All-Pro selection, he led the league in rushing yards in 2016 and 2018.

Early life
Elliott was born in Alton, Illinois, to a mother and father who were both athletes in college. His mother, the former Dawn Huff, was a high school state champion in three sports before attending the University of Missouri and running track there. His father, Stacy, was a linebacker for the Missouri football team and CEO of Fifth Down Enterprises. Elliott's maternal grandfather played basketball for Drake University. His uncle is Finnish professional basketball player Shawn Huff.

High school career
Despite his athletic pedigree, Elliott attended more academically driven John Burroughs School in Ladue, Missouri, where he was a three-sport star in football, basketball, and track and field. He also played baseball. He played as a running back for the John Burroughs Bombers football team. As a junior in 2012, he was named the St. Louis Post-Dispatch offensive player of the year after rushing for 1,802 yards and 34 touchdowns and receiving 23 passes for 401 yards and six scores. In his senior year, he had 3,061 all-purpose yards and 50 total touchdowns, including 2,155 rushing yards and 40 rushing touchdowns. He led the football team to three straight championship games, but lost all three.

Also a standout track and field athlete, Elliott was a state qualifier in sprinting and hurdling events. He capped his high school career by winning four state championships at the Missouri Class 3 state championships in  hours (100-meter dash, 200-meter dash, 110-meter high hurdles and 300-meter hurdles). He recorded career-best times of 10.95 seconds in the 100-meter dash, 22.05 seconds in the 200-meter dash, 13.77 seconds in the 110m hurdles and 37.52 seconds in the 300m hurdles. He was named the Gatorade Track Athlete of the Year in the state of Missouri.

Considered a four-star recruit by Scout.com, Elliott was listed as the No. 9 running back in the nation in 2013. He played in the 2013 U.S. Army All-American Bowl. Despite overwhelming support and pressure for Elliott to sign with his parents' alma mater, the University of Missouri, he decided to sign with Ohio State University.

College career
As a true freshman at Ohio State University in 2013, Elliott rushed for 262 yards on 30 carries with two touchdowns as a backup to starter Carlos Hyde, mostly playing as a gunner on special teams.

In 2014, with the departure of Hyde to the NFL, Elliott took over as the starter for the Buckeyes. During the season, Elliott was named to the Academic All-Big Ten Conference team. Elliott rushed over 100 yards six times during the scheduled season. In the 2014 Big Ten Championship Game against the Wisconsin Badgers, Elliott ran for 220 yards on 20 carries for two touchdowns. This win qualified Ohio State for the first-ever College Football Playoff. In the 2015 Sugar Bowl against #1 Alabama, Elliott ran for 230 yards on 20 carries in a hard-fought 42–35 win where he was named the Offensive Player of the Game. He then capped the Buckeyes' championship season by rushing for 246 yards on 36 carries and scoring four touchdowns against the Oregon Ducks. He was named the Offensive MVP of that game as well; it was the third most rushing yards ever by an Ohio State player.

In 2015, Elliott began the season by rushing for over 100 yards in 10 straight wins, including 274 against Indiana on October 3 (the second most all-time by an Ohio State player). However, the team suffered a 14–17 loss to Michigan State on November 21, 2015, and Elliott announced that he would enter the 2016 NFL Draft. The following week, Elliott ran for 214 yards on 30 carries in a 42–13 Ohio State victory over rival Michigan in Ann Arbor, his fifth 200+ yard game. He ended his collegiate career with 149 yards and four touchdowns in a Fiesta Bowl win over Notre Dame.

Elliott finished his career at Ohio State on several leaderboards. He was second in career rushing yards with 3,961 and yards per game with 101.6 (both behind only Archie Griffin), had the second and third most rushing yards in a season, and five of the top 20 rushing yards in a game. His 43 rushing touchdowns was fourth most all time, and his 23 in 2015 was third most in a season. His twelve 100-yard rushing games in the 2015 season tied Eddie George for a school record, and the 22 he amassed over his career was again second only to Griffin (as was his streak of 15 consecutive 100-yard games from 2014 to 2015). He and George are the only Ohio State players with five 200-yard rushing games.

Individual awards
Elliott received numerous honors during his tenure at Ohio State. In the 2014 season, Elliott was named the Offensive MVP of both the 2015 Sugar Bowl and the 2015 College Football Playoff National Championship Game.

Elliott's success at the end of the 2014 season made him a front-runner for the 2015 Heisman Trophy, though he in fact finished 8th in the voting. After a successful regular season in which he gained 1,672 yards and 19 touchdowns, Elliott was named the 2015 Graham-George Offensive Player of the Year, 2015 Ameche-Dayne Running Back of the Year and was selected as Unanimous First Team All-Big Ten. In addition to the yearly awards, he was also named Big Ten Player of the Week twice during the 2015 season for his performances in Week 5 against Indiana, and in Week 13 against Michigan.

Statistics

Professional career
Before the draft, Elliott was labeled the most complete back to enter the NFL since Adrian Peterson in 2007, and was predicted to be a top 10 selection. On a draft breakdown by NFL.com, he drew comparisons to Edgerrin James and was listed as a three-down back that had "rare combination of size, athleticism, pass-catching and blocking skills", and that he "should still come out of the gates as one of the most productive young running backs in the league".
 

Elliott was selected in the first round with the fourth overall pick by the Dallas Cowboys in the 2016 NFL Draft on April 28, 2016. He was the first running back selected in the draft that year. Elliott was widely regarded as an early favorite for the 2016 Offensive Rookie of the Year while playing behind what many agreed upon as the NFL's most dominant offensive line leading up to the 2016 NFL season.

2016 season: Rookie year
On May 18, 2016, Elliott signed his four-year rookie contract reportedly worth $24.9 million with a $16.3 million signing bonus.

Elliott was named the Cowboys' starting running back going into the regular season, ahead of veterans Alfred Morris and Darren McFadden. In the season-opener against the New York Giants, he rushed for 51 yards on 20 attempts and scored his first NFL touchdown on an eight-yard run in the narrow 20–19 loss. In the next game against the Washington Redskins, Elliott had 21 carries for 83 yards and a touchdown but also fumbled twice, losing one of them. The Cowboys prevailed on the road 27–23. During Week 3 against the Chicago Bears, he posted his first game with over a hundred yards and finished the 31–17 victory with 140 rushing yards on 30 carries. In the next game, against the San Francisco 49ers, he had 138 rushing yards and a rushing touchdown in the 24–17 road victory. During Week 5 against the Cincinnati Bengals, Elliott rushed for 134 yards on 15 carries and scored two rushing touchdowns, including a 60-yard touchdown as the Cowboys won 28–14. In the next game against the Green Bay Packers, Elliott continued his four-game streak with over 100 yards after carrying the ball 28 times for 157 rushing yards in the 30–16 road victory.

After the ninth game of the 2016 season, he became the second Cowboys rookie to rush for more than 1,000 yards in a season, after Tony Dorsett achieved the mark in 1977. He also became the third running back to rush for 1,000 yards after just the ninth game of his career, joining Adrian Peterson and Eric Dickerson.

During a Week 10 35–30 road victory over the Pittsburgh Steelers, Elliott recorded 209 scrimmage yards and three touchdowns, including his first NFL receiving touchdown on an 83-yard pass from fellow rookie Dak Prescott, and a 32-yard run for the game-winning touchdown with nine seconds left. During a Week 11 27–17 victory over the Baltimore Ravens, Elliott rushed for 97 yards and passed Tony Dorsett's Cowboys rookie rushing record on his second carry.

In Week 15, after scoring a touchdown against Tampa Bay, Elliott jumped into an oversized Salvation Army Red Kettle, an unusual touchdown celebration. Since 1997 the Dallas Cowboys Thanksgiving Day football game halftime show has traditionally kicked off the Red Kettle campaign. With that rushing touchdown, he surpassed Tony Dorsett and Herschel Walker for the Cowboys rookie record. He ran for 159 yards in the 26–20 victory. Because the Cowboys clinched the number one seed and home field advantage throughout the playoffs, Elliott rushed for 80 yards in a Week 16 42–21 victory over the Detroit Lions and did not play in the regular-season finale against the Philadelphia Eagles.

Elliott finished his rookie year as the NFL's top rusher with 1,631 yards, which was the 47th best season all-time, the third most by a rookie (behind Eric Dickerson's 1,808 in 1983 and George Rogers' 1,674 in 1981), and the youngest player to reach 1,600 yards. He finished third with 15 touchdowns behind LeGarrette Blount and David Johnson. He tied Mike Anderson, Clinton Portis, and Ickey Woods for the second most all-time by a rookie behind Eric Dickerson's 18. Elliott's 464 yards after contact ranked fourth among NFL running backs. As a result of his successful season, Elliott was selected as a First-team All-Pro, and earned his first Pro Bowl, joining Dak Prescott as the first rookie running back and quarterback duo in NFL history to be selected. He was also ranked seventh by his peers on the NFL Top 100 Players of 2017 as the highest ranked running back.

In his first NFL playoff game, Elliott ran 22 times for 125 yards in a 34–31 loss to the Green Bay Packers in the Divisional Round, joining Duane Thomas as the only Cowboy rookie to rush for over 100 yards in a playoff game.

2017 season

On August 11, 2017, the NFL suspended Elliott for the first six games of the 2017 season for violating the personal conduct policy. His suspension stemmed from accusations of domestic violence against his ex-girlfriend on five occasions in 2016. NFL officials conducted a year-long investigation into the allegations, and though Elliott was never criminally charged, decided to suspend him. On August 16, Elliott announced that he would appeal the suspension. Although the suspension was upheld on September 6 by a league-appointed arbitrator, on September 8, a federal judge granted a request for injunction by the NFL Players Association (NFLPA), putting the suspension on hold indefinitely.

In the season-opener against the New York Giants on NBC Sunday Night Football, Elliott rushed for 104 yards on 24 attempts as the Cowboys won by a score of 19–3. During Week 2, Elliott had the worst game of his career statistically in an away game against the Denver Broncos. He was held to eight rushing yards on nine carries in the 42–17 road loss.

On October 12, the Fifth Circuit U.S. Court of Appeals announced that Elliot's suspension had been reinstated, meaning that he would have to serve the six-game suspension up from that point. On October 18, Elliott was granted a temporary restraining order, meaning that he would not have to serve his suspension from that point, allowing him to play in Week 7. During Week 7 against the San Francisco 49ers, Elliott rushed for 147 yards and two touchdowns and had a 72-yard touchdown reception from Dak Prescott in the 40–10 road victory.

On October 30, Judge Katherine Polk Failla of the New York Southern District Court, denied Elliott's request for a preliminary injunction, which reinstated the 6-game suspension. The following day, the NFLPA filed an emergency motion for the injunction.

On November 3, Elliott was once again granted a stay by the United States Court of Appeals for the Second Circuit, which delayed the suspension.

On November 9, the suspension was once again reinstated by the United States Court of Appeals for the Second Circuit. Three days afterward, Elliott decided to accept the suspension and leave the country to train for a little while. On November 15, he officially announced that he withdrew from another appeal attempt. During his suspension, Elliott had been training and rehabbing his hamstrings in Mexico before his reinstatement. Elliott returned in Week 16 during a must-win situation against the Seattle Seahawks, where he rushed for 97 yards on 24 carries. The Cowboys lost, 21–12, and were eliminated from playoff contention. In the regular season finale against the Philadelphia Eagles, Elliott recorded 27 carries for 103 rushing yards in the 6–0 victory.

Elliott finished the 2017 season with 242 carries for 983 yards and seven touchdowns to go along with 26 receptions for 269 yards and two touchdowns in 10 games and starts. He was ranked 54th by his peers on the NFL Top 100 Players of 2018.

2018 season
In the first two games of the season, Elliott recorded a rushing touchdown in both games against the Carolina Panthers and New York Giants. During a Week 3 24–13 road loss to the Seattle Seahawks, he rushed for 127 yards. In the next game against the Detroit Lions, he had 152 rushing yards along with four receptions for 88 yards and a touchdown in a 26–24 victory. During Week 6, he ran for 106 yards and a touchdown against the Jacksonville Jaguars. With his only score, Elliott became the 12th Cowboy to reach 25 touchdowns on the ground as well as the fastest to do so, three games faster than Emmitt Smith. During a Week 10 27–20 road victory, Elliott scored twice, racking up 151 rushing yards and 36 receiving yards against the reigning Super Bowl champions, the Philadelphia Eagles. He broke 150 yards rushing for the fifth time in his career, surpassing DeMarco Murray for third-most in franchise history. In the next game, he recorded 201 scrimmage yards and a touchdown against the Atlanta Falcons, his fourth game over 200, tying with DeMarco Murray and Emmitt Smith for most in franchise history. Elliott continued his success, with 121 yards and a score on the run against the Washington Redskins on Thanksgiving, eclipsing 1,000 yards on the year, the second time of his career, tied for third (along with DeMarco Murray & Calvin Hill) most in Cowboys' history. In a narrow Week 13 13–10 road victory over the New Orleans Saints on Thursday Night Football, Elliott recorded 136 scrimmage yards and a receiving touchdown.

Elliott finished the 2018 season with 1,434 rushing yards and six touchdowns to go along with 77 receptions for 567 yards and three touchdowns in 15 games and starts. He won the rushing title for the second time in three seasons. Elliott earned a second Pro Bowl nomination for his 2018 season.

The Cowboys finished atop the NFC East and made the playoffs as the #4-seed for the NFC Playoffs. In the 2019 NFC Wild Card Round against the Seattle Seahawks, Elliott rushed 26 times for 137 yards and a touchdown in the 24–22 victory. In the Divisional Round against the Los Angeles Rams, he had 20 carries for 47 yards and a touchdown in the 30–22 loss. He was ranked 18th by his fellow players on the NFL Top 100 Players of 2019.

2019 season

On April 17, 2019, the Cowboys picked up the fifth-year option on Elliott's contract. However, Elliott began holding out during training camp, demanding a contract extension. On September 4, Elliott signed a six-year extension with the Cowboys worth $90 million, with $50 million guaranteed, keeping him under contract through the 2026 season.

In Elliott's first game back, he rushed 13 times for 53 yards and a touchdown in the 35–17 opening game victory over the New York Giants. In the next game against the Washington Redskins, Elliott rushed 23 times for 111 yards and a touchdown in a 31–21 road victory. The following week against the Miami Dolphins, Elliott rushed 19 times for 125 yards as the Cowboys won 31–6. In Week 6 against the New York Jets, Elliott rushed 28 times for 105 yards and a touchdown and caught five passes for 48 yards in the 24–22 road loss. In the next game against the Philadelphia Eagles, he rushed 22 times for 111 yards and a touchdown and caught six passes for 36 yards in the 37–10 victory. After a Week 8 bye, the Cowboys faced the New York Giants on Monday Night Football. In that game, Elliott rushed 23 times for 139 yards in the 37–18 road victory. During Week 14 against the Chicago Bears on Thursday Night Football, he rushed 19 times for 84 yards and two touchdowns in the 31–24 loss. During the game, Elliott reached 1,000 rushing yards on the season. In Week 15 against the Los Angeles Rams, Elliott rushed 24 times for 117 yards and two touchdowns and caught three passes for 43 yards during the 44–21 win. In the regular-season finale against the Redskins, Elliott rushed 18 times for 122 yards and a touchdown and caught three passes for two yards and a touchdown during the 47–16 win. Elliott earned his third Pro Bowl nomination for 2019.

Elliott finished the 2019 season with 1,357 rushing yards and 12 touchdowns to go along with 54 receptions for 420 yards and two touchdowns in 15 games and starts. He was ranked 24th by his fellow players on the NFL Top 100 Players of 2020.

2020 season

During the season-opening 20–17 loss to the Los Angeles Rams on NBC Sunday Night Football, Elliott rushed 22 times for 96 yards and a touchdown and caught three passes for 31 yards and a touchdown. In the next game against the Atlanta Falcons, he rushed 22 times for 89 yards and a rushing touchdown to go along with six receptions for 33 receiving yards during the 40–39 comeback victory.

During Week 5 against the New York Giants, Elliott recorded 105 yards from scrimmage and two rushing touchdowns during the 37–34 win. In Week 11 against the Minnesota Vikings, Elliott rushed for 103 yards and recorded two receptions for 11 yards and a touchdown during the 31–28 win. This was his first 100-yard rushing game of the season. Elliott missed his first career game due to injury on December 20, 2020, in Week 15 against the San Francisco 49ers, whom the Cowboys went on to beat 41-33. In Week 16 against the Philadelphia Eagles, he had 19 carries for 105 yards in the 37–17 victory.

Elliott finished the 2020 season with 979 rushing yards and six touchdowns to go along with 52 receptions for 338 yards and two touchdowns.

2021 season
On August 27, 2021, the Cowboys restructured Elliott's contract, converting $8.6 million of his base salary for the upcoming season into a signing bonus to save some salary cap space. Despite dealing with lingering knee and ankle injuries during the majority of the season, Elliott was still able to start all 17 games and rush for 1,002 yards and ten touchdowns on 237 carries along with 47 receptions for 287 yards and two touchdowns. He had two games going over the 100-yard mark and four games with multiple touchdowns.

In the Wild Card Round against the San Francisco 49ers, Elliott rushed for 31 yards in the 23–17 loss. After the game, it was revealed that Elliott was playing with a partially torn PCL, which he suffered in Week 4 against the Carolina Panthers.

2022 season
In the Divisional Round against the San Francisco 49ers, Elliott rushed for 26 yards and played center for one play in the 19–12 loss.

Elliot was released from the Cowboys on March 15, 2023.

NFL career statistics

Regular season

Postseason

NFL highlights and awards
FedEx Ground Player of the Year (2016)
Offensive Rookie of the Month –  October 2016
4× Pepsi NFL Rookie of the Week 
NFC Offensive Player of the Week –  Week 10, 2016
NFL Castrol Edge Clutch Performer of the Week – Week 10, 2016
2× NFL FedEx Ground Running Back of the Week – Weeks 4 and 5, 2016

Personal life
Elliott bought his parents Dawn and Stacy Elliott a new house after signing his rookie contracts. He studied marketing at Ohio State University. He was good friends with fellow Buckeye teammate  Kosta Karageorge, who was a walk-on defensive end. Karageorge received national attention when he died from a self-inflicted gunshot wound to the head. Elliott was surprised by the death of his friend. "Our hearts dropped," he told ESPN. "It was just a hard moment for all of us. For me, personally, that was my first time losing someone that I was very close with."

In August 2020, Elliott became a shareholder of OnCore Golf Technology, Inc., a manufacturer of golf balls based in Buffalo, New York.

In May 2021, Elliott was cited by police after one of his dogs bit and injured two people in his Frisco neighborhood.

References

External links
 
 Twitter
 Ohio State Buckeyes bio
 Dallas Cowboys bio

1995 births
Living people
African-American players of American football
American football running backs
Dallas Cowboys players
National Conference Pro Bowl players
Ohio State Buckeyes football players
Players of American football from St. Louis
21st-century African-American sportspeople